Adliwala Village is located in Ajnala tehsil district in Amritsar, Punjab, 16 km away from the district headquarter of Amritsar. As of 2011, the total population of the village was 3,949 (2,122 men and 1,827 women).

References 

Villages in Amritsar district